The Qarabağ 2016–17 season is Qarabağ's 24th Azerbaijan Premier League season, of which they are defending champions, and will be their ninth season under manager Gurban Gurbanov. They won the League for the fourth season in a row on 16 April 2017, reaching the final of the Azerbaijan Cup and the group stages of the UEFA Europa League having been eliminated from the UEFA Champions League in the 3rd qualifying round by Viktoria Plzeň on away goals.

Squad

Out on loan

Transfers

Summer

In:

Out:

Winter

In:

Out:

Friendlies

Competitions

Azerbaijan Premier League

Results summary

Results

League table

Azerbaijan Cup

Final

UEFA Champions League

Qualifying phase

UEFA Europa League

Qualifying rounds

Group stage

Squad statistics

Appearances and goals

|-
|colspan="14"|Players away from Qarabağ on loan:
|-
|colspan="14"|Players who appeared for Qarabağ but left during the season:

|}

Goal scorers

Disciplinary record

Notes

References

External links 
 Official Website

Qarabağ FK seasons
Qarabağ
Qarabag
Azerbaijani football clubs 2016–17 season